Lorenzo Musetti won the boys' singles tennis title at the 2019 Australian Open, defeating Emilio Nava in the final, 4–6, 6–2, 7–6(14–12).

Sebastian Korda was the defending champion but chose to participate in the men's singles qualifying as a wild card, lost to Go Soeda in the first round.

Seeds

Draw

Finals

Top half

Section 1

Section 2

Bottom half

Section 3

Section 4

Qualifying

This article displays the qualifying draw for Boys' singles at the 2019 Australian Open.

Seeds

Qualifiers

Draw

First qualifier

Second qualifier

Third qualifier

Fourth qualifier

Fifth qualifier

Sixth qualifier

Seventh qualifier

Eighth qualifier

References

External links 
 Main draw at ausopen.com
 Draw at itftennis.com

Boys' Singles
Australian Open, 2019 Boys' Singles